Griffiniella is one of several cockroach genera in the family Blaberidae, the giant cockroach or ovoviviparous cockroach family. The genus was described by Heinrich Hugo Karny in 1908, and named by him in honor of the prolific author Dr. Achille Griffini of the Royal Technical Institute of Genoa.

References

Cockroach genera
Taxa named by Carl Brunner von Wattenwyl